Pius Schuwey (1970–2020) was a Swiss ski mountaineer from Jaun.

Selected results
 1999:
 5th, Pierra Menta (together with Heinz Blatter)
 2002:
 1st, Swiss Cup
 3rd, European Cup race, Gros Roig
 3rd, Trophée des Gastlosen (together with Laurent Gremaud)
 7th, World Championshipg team race (together with Alexander Hug)
 2003:
 2nd, Trophée des Gastlosen (together with Pierre-Marie Taramarcaz)
 2004:
 1st, Zermatt-Rothorn run
 3rd, Trophée des Gastlosen, together with Sébastien Epiney
 2006:
 1st, Zermatt-Rothorn run
 4th, Swiss Championship vertical race
 2008:
 1st and course record, Zermatt-Rothorn run
 2009:
 1st, Montée nocturne de la Berra 
 2nd, L'Américaine de Chia race (together with Eric Charriere)

Patrouille des Glaciers

 1998: 4th "seniors II" ranking, together with François Bussard and Daniel Thurler
 2000: 4th (and 1st "seniors II" ranking), together with Jean-François Cuennet and Eric Seydoux
 2004: 5th, together with Emmanuel Vaudan and Didier Moret
 2006: 4th (and 2nd international military teams ranking), together with Cpl Ernest Farquet and Cpl Stéphane Gay

References

1970 births
2020 deaths
Swiss male ski mountaineers
Sportspeople from the canton of Fribourg